The 2019 San Diego State Aztecs football team represented San Diego State University in the 2019 NCAA Division I FBS football season. The Aztecs were led by ninth year head coach Rocky Long and played their final home games at SDCCU Stadium. San Diego State competed as a member of the Mountain West Conference in the West Division.

On January 8, 2020, head coach Rocky Long resigned.

Previous season

San Diego State finished 7-6 overall and 4-4 in Conference Play and finished fourth place overall and were invited to the Frisco Bowl where they lost to Ohio.

Recruiting

Position Key

Recruits

Preseason

Mountain West media days
Mountain West Media Days will be held on July 23–24 at the Cosmopolitan at the Las Vegas Strip

Media poll
The preseason poll was released at the Mountain West media days on July 23, 2019. The Aztecs were predicted to finish in second place in the MW West Division.

Schedule

Game summaries

Weber State

at UCLA

at New Mexico State

Utah State

at Colorado State

Wyoming

at San Jose State

at UNLV

Nevada

Fresno State

at Hawaii

BYU

vs. Central Michigan (New Mexico Bowl)

Rankings

Players drafted into the NFL

References

San Diego State
San Diego State Aztecs football seasons
New Mexico Bowl champion seasons
San Diego State Aztecs football